
Gmina Raszyn is a rural gmina (administrative district) in Pruszków County, Masovian Voivodeship, in east-central Poland. Raszyn is a suburb of Warsaw.

Villages
Gmina Raszyn contains the villages and settlements of Dawidy, Dawidy Bankowe, Falenty, Falenty Duże, Falenty Nowe, Janki, Jaworowa, Łady, Laszczki, Nowe Grocholice, Podolszyn Nowy, Puchały, Raszyn, Rybie, Sękocin Las, Sękocin Nowy, Sękocin Stary, Słomin and Wypędy.

Neighbouring gminas
Gmina Raszyn is bordered by the city of Warsaw and by the gminas of Lesznowola, Michałowice and Nadarzyn.

References
Polish official population figures 2006

Raszyn
Pruszków County